Agami (English: The Next) is a 1984 Bangladeshi film starring Pijush Banerjee, Aly Zaker and Rowshan in lead roles. It received National Film Awards for Best Short-length film. It deals with 1971 Independence war of Bangladesh.

Awards 
Bangladesh National Film Awards
Best Short-length film - Morshedul Islam

References

1984 films
Bengali-language Bangladeshi films
Films scored by Shimul Yousuf
1980s Bengali-language films
Films directed by Morshedul Islam
Films based on the Bangladesh Liberation War